American Visions: The Epic History of Art in America is a 1997 book by art critic Robert Hughes. It was also turned into a 6-part documentary series featuring the author.

Contents
O My America, My New Founde Land
The Republic of Virtue
The Wilderness and the West
American Renaissance
The Gritty Cities
Early Modernism
Streamlines and Breadlines
The Empire of Signs
The Age of Anxiety

Reception
Booklist called American Visions a "sensational history of American art." and wrote "The contrast between the influence of nature and of the city on American art is the fulcrum of Hughes' entire narrative ..." and Choice Reviews stated "The book bears the stamp of the author's aesthetic sensibilities (which value works of art for their technical competence as well as visual and intellectual qualities), his critical acuity, and his accomplished writing."

Kirkus Reviews gave a starred review and described it as an "eminently readable handbook on American art.", writing "His readings of three centuries of both art works and trends are lively, detailed, and persuasive (though perhaps a bit too harsh regarding recent art), and his ultimately pessimistic take is expressed with great clarity. A meaty and illuminating excavation, full of vigor and punch..." Publishers Weekly noted "this is no bland, dumbed-down survey intended to flatter its subject or its audience. Hughes writes with an aesthete's disdain for political posturing, a traditionalist's belief in the importance of technical skills (painters are frequently taken to task for their shoddy draftsmanship) and a pragmatist's contempt for mystagogical bunk.", found "his account of the contemporary scene is disappointingly brief." and concluded "This slashingly witty, briskly paced, ferociously opinionated tour of the American visual landscape is a book that even the most un-likeminded readers will love to hate."

A review by The New York Times calls it a "witty and impassioned history of American art from its beginnings to the present day", "beautiful and essential", notes that "Mr. Hughes fortunately remains the critic throughout his historical canvassing, making distinctions and judgments without taking sides." and concludes "With it, Mr. Hughes has made American art safe for the receptive alien deep inside us all." American Visions has also been reviewed by the London Review of Books, The Journal of American History, and The New York Review of Books.

References

External links
Library holdings of American Visions
Booknotes interview with Hughes on American Visions: The Epic History of Art in America, July 20, 1997, C-SPAN

1997 non-fiction books
20th-century history books
Australian non-fiction books
American art
Art criticism
Art history books
History books about the United States